Amir Khan vs. Paul McCloskey was a 140-pound world title fight, that was aired on HBO's World Championship Boxing, as part of an HBO-televised split-site double-header, which also included WBC Welterweight Championship fight, Andre Berto vs. Victor Ortiz. Following on from Khan's successful title defence against Marcos Maidana, Champion Amir returned to Manchester to continue his title defence against EBU Super Lightweight Champion Paul McCloskey at the Manchester Evening News Arena.

Build-up
Khan survived a brutal late onslaught from Marcos Maidana to retain his WBA light-welterweight title in December 2010. It was looking like an easy night's work in round one. Khan dropped Maidana with a vicious left to the body that had the Argentinian writhing in agony. During round 10, was where that Maidana had much of his success, threading huge uppercuts through his tight guard and ripping shots to his ribs on both flanks in a vain effort to bring his gloves down. He won the bout unanimous decision. Khan had two 10–8 rounds, the first and the fifth, when the referee Joe Cortez docked Maidana a point for elbowing on the break.

McCloskey produced a classy European light-welterweight title defence as he stopped Scotland's Barry Morrison in seven rounds. The Dungiven man picked off Morrison in the opening rounds in Letterkenny and then put the ex-British champion on the canvas with a big right in the fifth. Morrison tried to get McCloskey involved in a brawl but the end came after another knockdown in the seventh. It was McCloskey's second defence of his title and his 22nd straight win. Morrison had no answer to McCloskey's fast hands and the Derry man showed punching power as well with his right hook in the fifth which caught the Scot flush on the temple.

The fight

The fight started with Khan as the main aggressor with little changing for five rounds. McCloskey evaded a lot of Khan's punches with superb upper body movement but he was not throwing enough punches to win rounds. In the decisive sixth Khan staggered McCloskey and moments later the pair went toe-to-toe, clashing heads as Khan came in for a right hand, McCloskey and Khan both stopped and the referee intervened. The fight was then stopped because of a cut to McCloskey's left eye.

Khan had some trouble with an awkward and resilient southpaw, who was difficult to hit cleanly, however, he ended up winning all six rounds on all three cards.

There is some controversy over the stoppage, with The Independents Steve Bunce questioning the doctor's reason for entering the ring

Undercard

TelevisedLight-Welterweight Championship bout: Amir Khan vs.  Paul McCloskey
Khan defeats McCloskey by technical decision in round 6. (60–54, 60–54,60–54)Middleweight bout: Martin Murray vs.  John Anderson Carvalho
Murray defeats Carvalho by TKO at 2:20 in round 4.Welterweight bout: Craig Watson vs.  Lee Purdy
Purdy defeats Watson by TKO at 0:40 in round 5.

Preliminary cardSuper Bantamweight bout: Rendall Munroe vs.  Andrei Isaeu
Munroe defeats Isaeu by unanimous decision. (116–112, 115–114, 117–112)Lightweight bout: Graeme Higginson vs.  Andy Murray
Murray defeated Higginson by points.Heavyweight bout: Richard Towers vs. Raman Sukhaterin
Towers defeats Sukhaterin by RTD. The fight was stopped at the end of round four.Super Bantamweight bout: Kid Galahad vs. Dai Davies
Galahad defeated Davies by points.Bantamweight bout:' Tasif Khan vs. Pavels Senkovs
Khan defeated Senkovs by points.

International broadcasting

References

External links
 
HBO

Boxing matches
2011 in boxing
Boxing in England
Sports competitions in Manchester
2011 in English sport
Boxing on HBO
Golden Boy Promotions
2010s in Manchester
Amir Khan (boxer)
April 2011 sports events in the United Kingdom